IRD or Ird may refer to the following:
 Ird (Bedouin), a Bedouin honor code for women
 Ird, alternate name of Arad, Iran, a city in Fars Province
 Ishwardi Airport (IATA airport code)
 Kaarel Ird (1909–1986), Estonian theatre leader, director and actor

As an initialism, IRD may refer to:
 Illinois Refining Division, a division of Marathon Petroleum Corporation located in Robinson, Illinois.
 Influenza Research Database, a publicly available database and analysis resource for influenza virus research
 Inland Revenue Department (disambiguation), in some countries
 Integrated receiver/decoder
 Institut de recherche pour le développement ("Institute of research for development"), a French scientific institution dedicated to the development of tropical countries
 Intelligent Resource Director, on IBM mainframes
 International Relief and Development Inc., a USAID grantee
 Internet radio device
 Institute on Religion and Democracy, a conservative Christian organization
 Information Research Department, a former department of the British Foreign Office
 "Image Replacement Document", another name for Substitute check as defined in the Check Clearing for the 21st Century Act (Check 21)
 Interest rate derivative, a financial instrument
Interest Rate Differential (IRD), weighs the contrast in interest rates between two similar interest-bearing assets
 Ice rafted debris
 International Road Dynamics
 Inherited Retinal Disease